HDU may refer to:

 Hangzhou Dianzi University, in Hangzhou, China
 Hard disk drive
 Hồng Đức University, in Vietnam
 High dependency unit, a hospital facility
 High Dependency Unit (band), a New Zealand psychedelic rock band
 High dependency unit (mental health), a psychiatric treatment facility
 Croatian Phonographic Association (HDU, Hrvatska diskografska udruga) that publishes the Croatian music chart Top of the Shops